Gary Thompson (born August 9, 1945) is a Canadian former soccer player who played as a striker at both professional and international levels.

Career

Club career
After playing college soccer at the University of British Columbia, Thompson spent four seasons as a professional in the North American Soccer League with the Vancouver Whitecaps, making a total of 27 appearances.

International career
Thompson played seven times for Canada; four games in 1976 and three in 1977. Thompson was also a member of the Canadian Olympic soccer team which failed to qualify for the 1972 Summer Olympics, making seven appearances in total – one during qualifying and six in the Pan American Games.

References

1945 births
Living people
Association football forwards
Canada men's international soccer players
Canadian soccer players
North American Soccer League (1968–1984) players
North American Soccer League (1968–1984) indoor players
Soccer players from Vancouver
Vancouver Whitecaps (1974–1984) players